Les Parents terribles is a French TV film from 1980. It was directed by Yves-André Hubert, starring Jean Marais, France Delahalle, and Lila Kedrova. It is based on the play with the same title by Jean Cocteau.

Cast 
 Jean Marais: Georges
 France Delahalle: Leo
 Lila Kedrova: Yvonne
 François Duval: Michel
 Anne Ludovik: Madeleine

References

External links 
 

1980 television films
1980 films
Films based on works by Jean Cocteau
French television films
1980s French-language films
1980s French films